Oh Jae-hyeok (born 21 June 2002) is a South Korean footballer currently playing as a midfielder for Bucheon FC 1995.

Career statistics

Club

Notes

References

2002 births
Living people
South Korean footballers
South Korea youth international footballers
Association football midfielders
K League 1 players
K League 2 players
Pohang Steelers players
Bucheon FC 1995 players